TVEL is also a Russian abbreviation of the "heat-releasing element", fuel rod.

The TVEL Fuel Company (TVEL) is a Russian nuclear fuel cycle company headquartered in Moscow. It has operated since 1996.

History and operations
The company was founded by Vitaliy Konovalov in 1996. He headed the company until 2000.

It works mainly in uranium enrichment and the production of nuclear fuel. TVEL belongs to the Atomenergoprom holding company (part of Rosatom).

TVEL supplies fuel to the Czech Republic, Slovakia, Bulgaria, Hungary, Ukraine, Armenia, Lithuania, Finland, China and India. In the world, 73 power reactors (17% of the world market by number) and 30 research reactors are currently running with TVEL made fuel.

TVEL is developing the TVS-K fuel assembly for Western-designed reactors.  As of 2017 TVS-K is in pilot usage, and TVEL hopes it will be ready for commercial supply in 2021.

The chairman of the board of directors is Yuri Olenin. The president of TVEL is Natalia Nikipelova.

Subsidiaries
Nuclear fuel production
 Mashinostroitelny Zavod Elektrostal
 Novosibirsk Plant of Chemical Concentrates
 Chepetsky Mechanical Plant
 Moscow Plant of Polymetals

Separation-sublimation assets
 Angarsk Electrolysis Chemical Combine
 Zelenogorsk Electrochemical Plant
 Siberian Chemical Combine
 Ural Electrochemical Plant

Research institutes and design bureaus
 Central Design and Technology Institute
 VNIINM
 Novouralsk Scientific and Design Center
 OKB-Nizhny Novgorod
 Centrotech-SPb
 Uralpribor

See also

 Energy policy of Russia
 Nuclear power in Russia
 Rosatom

References

External links
 

Mining companies of Russia
Nuclear fuel companies
Uranium mining companies of Russia
Rosatom
Companies based in Moscow